Yiyang South railway station is a railway station in Yiyang, Hunan, China. It is currently the western terminus of the Changde–Yiyang–Changsha high-speed railway. It opened on 6 September 2022 along with the first section of the line.

Structure
The station building has an arched facade with detailing said to be inspired by traditional bamboo craft. The waiting hall is above the platforms and spans the full length of the building.

See also
Yiyang railway station

References 

Railway stations in Hunan
Railway stations in China opened in 2022